The 1985 Lamar Cardinals football team represented Lamar University in the 1985 NCAA Division I-AA football season as a member of the Southland Conference.  The Cardinals played their home games at Cardinal Stadium now named Provost Umphrey Stadium in Beaumont, Texas.  Lamar finished the 1985 season with a 3–8 overall record and a 0–6 conference record.  The season marked the final year with Ken Stephens as Lamar Cardinals head football coach.

Schedule

References

Lamar
Lamar Cardinals football seasons
Lamar Cardinals football